This is the discography of Termanology.

Albums

Studio albums

Collaborative albums

Extended plays

Mixtapes

Guest appearances

Production

2012 
Ghostface Killah and Sheek Louch - Wu Block
 08. "Drivin' Round" (feat. Masta Killa, GZA, & Erykah Badu) (co-produced by Moose & Odie Peken)

2014 
Termanology - Shut Up And Rap
 14. "My Time 2 Shine" (feat. Lil Fame) (co-produced by The Arcitype & Artisin)

2015 
Sheek Louch - Silverback Gorilla 2
 07. "Hold It Straight" (co-produced by Shortfyuz & Sir Bob Nash)
 08. "Obamacare" (feat. Dyce Payne) (co-produced by L5)

2016 
Progress - U Ain't Hip
 09. "Live Wires" (feat. Slaine, Ea$y Money, Reks, Termanology, & DJ Deadeye)

Slaine - Slaine Is Dead
05. "Just The Way You Are" (feat. Termanology) (co-produced by DJ Deadeye & The Arcitype)

2017 
Slaine and Termanology - Anti-Hero
09. "Snakes" (feat. Sick Jacken and Jared Evan) (co-produced by Artisin & The Arcitype)

References

Hip hop discographies